Dębówka may refer to the following places:
Dębówka, Lublin Voivodeship (east Poland)
Dębówka, Garwolin County in Masovian Voivodeship (east-central Poland)
Dębówka, Podlaskie Voivodeship (north-east Poland)
Dębówka, Gmina Góra Kalwaria in Masovian Voivodeship (east-central Poland)
Dębówka, Sochaczew County in Masovian Voivodeship (east-central Poland)
Dębówka, Warsaw West County in Masovian Voivodeship (east-central Poland)
Dębówka, Żuromin County in Masovian Voivodeship (east-central Poland)
Dębówka, Greater Poland Voivodeship (west-central Poland)